Video game addiction is considered an impulse control disorder, analogous to pathological gambling that does not include using intoxicating drugs. In China, as well as other parts of the world, the disorder is considered a problem. In June 2018, the World Health Organization listed "gaming disorder" in the 11th Revision of its International Classification of Diseases. According to its definition, it is characterized by impaired control, prioritizing gaming by giving excessive time to games rather than other activities, lack of other interests in daily activities, and the continuation of gaming despite the negative consequences. China has in place multiple laws attempting to combat video game addiction in minors.

Possible addictive elements in video games
Many video games have no pre-defined endgame. The inclusion of downloadable content (DLC) means the game continues to expand over time.
DLC enables developers to expand their games and attract others for a player to play against. There is always another game.

Video games satisfy the need of social connections and activities. Today's games encourage players to interact with each other, supporting the societal demand for interpersonal connections. Massively multiplayer online role-playing games are an example of this.

Level reward systems are addictive, and provide incentives to the player to level up. In the introductory period of a game, players begin with basic characteristics with regards to attributes and skills. At low levels, it takes little effort to level up and progress. Each new level requires progressively more work to reach.

Multiplayer games do not end; this kind of game often encourages players to connect and collaborate with gamers around the world. Massively multiplayer online role-playing games let players connect with each other. Examples include League of Legends and PUBG.

Video games often have digital currencies. The more time players spend in a game, the more "wealth" they acquire. Players use this virtual wealth to "purchase" new aspects of the game.
Rewards are set on different time schedules in video games. Players may be rewarded for finishing tasks within a certain time frame, or might be given bonuses for playing during a pre-determined period.

The virtual gaming world continues to evolve, even when players are not online. Even when players are not playing, the game's world may continue to develop. This creates an incentive to keep playing the game due to the fear of falling behind.

Top players or teams can receive rewards in real life, as some tournaments offer cash prizes.
Video games do not reward short and unscheduled periods of player time. Achieving competency in games requires a large time investment. Casual players will often be unable to catch up to more dedicated players due to their lack of skills or in-game items.

Video games can generate strong emotions in players. Addictive games offer unique methods to create emotional connections with players. It is an unconscious decision for people addicted to computer games to spend more time playing when they are emotionally invested in a game.

Modern video games are enormous and dense. Many modern games focus on delivering large amounts of content through open-world levels or compulsion loops, allowing the player to delve deeply into a world for long periods of time.

Treatment 
Treatments may include in-patient intervention programs with a team of mental health professionals who are specialized in combating computer game addiction. Wilderness therapy, which is similar to in-patient treatment, provides treatment in an outdoor setting devoid of any technology or electronic devices. One-on-one counselling with a psychologist or mental health professional, experienced in working with computer game addictions, may be useful. 
 Family therapy entails a therapist looking at the family system and how it interacts with family activities. Computer game addiction books are available that allow an individual to self-treat their issues.

The Chinese government operates several clinics to treat those who overuse online games, chatting and web surfing. Treatment for the patients, most of whom have been forced to attend by parents or government officials, includes various forms of pain including shock therapy. In August 2009, Deng Sanshan was reportedly beaten to death in a correctional facility for video game and Web addiction.  Most of the addiction "boot camps" in China are actually extralegal militaristically managed centers, but have remained popular despite growing controversy over their practices.

Anti-addiction measures 

In August 2021, China’s strict limits on how long minors can play online video games got stricter. Chinese children and teenagers are barred from online gaming on school days, and limited to one hour a day on weekend and holiday evenings. 

A new law passed in November 2019 limits children under 18 to less than 90 minutes of playing video games on weekdays and three hours on weekends, with no video game playing allowed between 10 p.m. to 8 a.m. These are set by requiring game publishers to enforce these limits based on user logins. In September 2020, the government implemented its own name-based authentication system to be made available to all companies to uphold these laws.

In 2017 Tencent Games restricted young players to one or two hours of playing online games due to concerns about children's development. The new gaming restriction policy set up by Tencent was first applied to the mobile phone online game Strike of Kings.
Children who are under 12 years old are restricted to playing the game one hour per day, with no online access after 9:00 pm.
Anyone who is between 12 and 18 years old are restricted to two hours playing a day.

References 

Behavioral addiction
Chinese popular culture
Digital media use and mental health
Internet in China
Online games
Video game culture
Video gaming in China